Travis Graber is an American football coach.  He served as the head football coach at Bethel College in North Newton, Kansas from 2010  to 2011, compiling a record of 2–19.

Coaching career
In 2010, first-year head coach Graber took over a team that completed prior season a record of 3–7.  Graber was the team's defensive coordinator in 2009 and was promoted to the job after head coach Mike Moore resigned.  Graber's record at Bethel was 2–19.

On July 27, 2012, Graber resigned his position with a little more than a month before the beginning of the 2012 season.  School and athletic administration stated that it was entirely his decision to resign.

Head coaching record

References

Year of birth missing (living people)
Living people
Bethel Threshers football coaches
High school football coaches in Kansas
Kansas State University alumni
Wichita State University alumni